The Roman Catholic Archdiocese of San Pedro Sula (erected 2 February 1916 as the Vicariate Apostolic of San Pedro Sula) is a Latin Church ecclesiastical territory or archdiocese of the Catholic Church in Honduras. It was a suffragan of the Archdiocese of Tegucigalpa until 2023, when it was made a metropolitan archdiocese. It was elevated on 6 July 1963.

Ecclesiastical Province of San Pedro Sula

Its suffragan sees are
 Roman Catholic Diocese of La Ceiba
 Roman Catholic Diocese of Gracias
 Roman Catholic Diocese of Santa Rosa de Copán
 Roman Catholic Diocese of Trujillo (Honduras)
 Roman Catholic Diocese of Yoro

Leadership
Bishops of San Pedro Sula
Juan Sastre y Riutort, C.M. (1924–1949)
Antonio Capdevilla Ferrando, C.M. (1953–1962)
José García Villas, C.M. (1963–1965)
Jaime Brufau Maciá, C.M. (1966–1993)
Angel Garachana Pérez, C.M.F. (1994–2023)

Archbishops of San Pedro Sula
Michael Lenihan, O.F.M.

Auxiliary bishops
Rómulo Emiliani Sánchez (2002-2017)

Territorial losses

References
 

San Pedro Sula
San Pedro Sula
San Pedro Sula
Roman Catholic Ecclesiastical Province of Tegucigalpa